Jamie Frank Redknapp (born 25 June 1973) is an English former professional footballer who was active from 1989 until 2005. He is a pundit at Sky Sports and an editorial sports columnist at the Daily Mail. A technically skillful and creative midfielder, who was also an accurate and powerful free-kick taker, Redknapp played for AFC Bournemouth, Southampton, Liverpool, and Tottenham Hotspur, captaining the latter two. He also gained 17 England caps between 1995 and 1999, and was a member of England’s squad that reached the semi finals of Euro 1996. His 11 years at Liverpool were the most prolific, playing more than 237 league games for the club, including a spell as captain, and being involved in winning the 1995 Football League Cup final.

In a career that was blighted by a succession of injuries, Redknapp was as famous for his media profile off the field as much as on it. He married the pop singer Louise in 1998. Redknapp comes from a well-known footballing family. His father is the football manager Harry Redknapp. He is also a cousin of Frank Lampard, and a nephew of former West Ham United coach Frank Lampard, Sr.

Club career

Summary
Redknapp was born in Barton on Sea, Hampshire and started his career at Tottenham Hotspur as a youth player but turned down their offer of a contract, deciding to play for AFC Bournemouth under his father, manager Harry Redknapp. He went on to play for Liverpool where Redknapp would be remembered for his best performances. After that Redknapp returned and played two and a half seasons for Tottenham Hotspur then finally joined Southampton, where he played under his father for a second time. Redknapp was also capped 17 times by England, scoring one goal.

AFC Bournemouth
Redknapp started out on the road to professional football as a schoolboy at Tottenham Hotspur but began his professional career, at the age of 16, in 1989 at Bournemouth, then managed by his father, Harry. He made 13 appearances for the club before attracting the attention of Liverpool, who signed him on 15 January 1991. Kenny Dalglish had paid £350,000 for Redknapp, who was still only 17 at the time. He was one of the most expensively signed teenagers in English football around this time.

Liverpool

Redknapp was one of the last players to be signed by manager Kenny Dalglish before his surprising resignation on 22 February 1991 and later became the youngest Liverpool player to appear in European competition, at 18 years 120 days when making his Liverpool debut against Auxerre in the UEFA Cup on 23 October 1991, by which time Liverpool were being managed by Graeme Souness. This record was broken by Phil Charnock thirteen months later.

Redknapp's first goal for Liverpool came in his league debut on 7 December 1991 when he featured as a 63rd-minute substitute for Jan Mølby in a 1–1 draw with Southampton at the Dell.

Following Dalglish's departure, Redknapp was part of a transitional Liverpool team under Graeme Souness. He spent most of his first two-and-a-half years as a substitute or in the reserves, missing the 1992 FA Cup Final triumph and only becoming a regular first-team player in the 1993–94 season, at the expense of Mark Walters. At this time, Redknapp had also become one of the mass-marketed poster boy icons of the newly developing FA Premier League where, alongside other photogenic young players like Manchester United players Ryan Giggs and Lee Sharpe, he was used ceaselessly in commercials, advertising spots and for the league's promotional purposes in merchandising and sales, with the result being that football stars had become idols on par with rock stars and pop stars, by and around the mid to late 1990s.

Redknapp's contributions peaked during the 1998–99 season as he created numerous chances and scored 10 goals under new boss Gérard Houllier. Redknapp became vice- and then full club captain by 1999–2000 following the departures of John Barnes, Steve McManaman and Paul Ince.

His contributions helped the club back into the top three of the FA Premiership but a knee injury curtailed his involvement in the 2000–01 season and in a bid to cure long-standing injury troubles he underwent knee surgery under renowned knee specialist Dr Richard Steadman in the United States. As a result, Redknapp was unable to participate in the whole of the club's cup treble campaign which yielded the FA Cup, League Cup and UEFA Cup. Although injured, as the club captain he was called up by his teammates to receive the FA Cup with vice-captain Robbie Fowler at the Millennium Stadium in Cardiff. He made his comeback from injury during the pre-season tour before the 2001–02 season.

Redknapp's return did not last long as he was again struck by injury. On 27 October 2001 he played and scored in a 2–0 win over Charlton Athletic at The Valley, and then 3 days later he played what would prove to be his last game for the Merseyside club against Borussia Dortmund in the Champions League. He had played 308 times for the Reds and scored 41 goals, becoming a favourite amongst Liverpool fans, who included him at number 40 in the 2006 poll 100 Players Who Shook The Kop.

Tottenham Hotspur
Redknapp was allowed to join Glenn Hoddle's Tottenham Hotspur on a free transfer on 18 April 2002 with just a couple of fixtures remaining of the 2001–02 season. He made his debut at the beginning of the following campaign when he played on 17 August 2002 in the 2–2 league draw with his former club Liverpool's rival Everton at Goodison Park. Redknapp's pass into the path of Matthew Etherington allowed Etherington to score his first ever Premiership goal.

Redknapp scored his first goal for the club a week later on 26 August 2002 in the 1–0 league win over Aston Villa at White Hart Lane. Redknapp played 49 times for Spurs scoring 4 goals in his two-and-a-half years with the club before becoming his father Harry's first signing for Southampton on 4 January 2005.

Southampton
The 31-year-old joined Southampton's fight against relegation on a free transfer and made his debut on 5 January 2005 in the 3–3 league draw with Fulham at St Mary's. Redknapp's only goal for the club came three days later in the 3–1 FA Cup 3rd round victory over Northampton Town at Sixfields Stadium.

Redknapp was rarely fully fit during his brief spell at the Saints and was not able to prevent them from being relegated to the Championship after 27 successive seasons of top flight football.

At the end of the season, on 19 June 2005, the 31-year-old Redknapp decided to retire from the game due to his constant injury problems and on the advice of his medical specialists.

International career
England manager Terry Venables gave Redknapp his international debut on 6 September 1995 in the 0–0 international friendly with Colombia at Wembley. The game is probably best remembered for his mishit cross that produced René Higuita's famous 'scorpion kick'. It ranked 94th in Channel 4's 100 Greatest Sporting Moments in 2002.

Redknapp was capped 17 times for England but played just 39 minutes at a major tournament, which was during the Euro 96 campaign when he appeared as a substitute against Scotland in the group stage. Rob Smyth later wrote in The Guardian that Redknapp's "slick passing greased some slow-moving wheels". Injury ruled him out of contention for both the 1998 FIFA World Cup and UEFA Euro 2000.

His only international goal came on 10 October 1999 in the 2–1 friendly victory against Belgium at the Stadium of Light, Sunderland.

Coaching
On 21 September 2007, Chelsea reportedly approached Redknapp to become Avram Grant's assistant, as Chelsea's owner billionaire Roman Abramovich looked to shake up Stamford Bridge's coaching staff, though no appointment was forthcoming.

On 11 December 2008, it was announced Jamie Redknapp would become coach of Chelsea reserves two days a week whilst studying for his UEFA coaching badges. The vacancy arose after former Chelsea reserves coach Brendan Rodgers was hired by Championship outfit Watford.

Media career
Redknapp began his career in 2004 as a studio-based pundit on BBC during the European Championships. Since retiring he had gone into punditry full-time and is a regular studio pundit on Sky Sports alongside former England teammate Gary Neville. He is also a regular columnist on the Sky Sports website.

In 2005, Redknapp launched a bi-monthly magazine with his wife Louise and former teammate Tim Sherwood named Icon Magazine, aimed at professional footballers and their families.

In 2010, he was made host and mentor on the Sky1 show Football's Next Star, and a team captain in the Sky1 sports game show A League of Their Own.

Redknapp has received significant attention for his repeated overuse and misuse of the word "literally", in quotes such as "he literally chopped him in half in that challenge", "Alonso and Sissoko have been picked to literally sit in front of the back four", "Drogba literally destroyed Senderos today", "in his youth, Michael Owen was literally a greyhound", "he had to cut back inside onto his left, because he literally hasn't got a right foot", "Martin Jol's head is literally on the chopping block" and "these balls now – they literally explode off your feet". In 2010, he was presented with the Foot in Mouth Award from the Plain English Campaign for his poor use of English.

On 22 April 2021, chat show Redknapp's Big Night Out premieried on Sky One, presented by Jamie and Harry Redknapp with comedian Tom Davis.

Personal life
Redknapp's father is football manager Harry Redknapp, and his mother is Sandra Harris. He has one older brother, Mark, who is a model. He is the maternal cousin of Frank Lampard, whose father is former West Ham United player and Harry's former managerial assistant Frank Lampard, Sr.

Redknapp grew up on the south coast as his father was coaching Bournemouth at that time. He attended Twynham School in Christchurch and started playing in the Sunday league youth teams with his brother.

On 29 June 1998, Redknapp married the pop singer Louise Nurding, a member of the girl group Eternal. On 27 July 2004, Louise gave birth to a boy named Charles William "Charley" Redknapp at London's Portland Hospital. Charley was named after Louise's grandfather, who died on the day that she found out she was pregnant. On 10 November 2008, Louise gave birth to their second son, Beau Henry Redknapp. Louise revealed the name was a tribute to Jamie's father, Harry, who was born in Bow, London. The family lived in Oxshott, Surrey. After 19 years of marriage, Jamie and Louise Redknapp were granted a divorce on 29 December 2017.

On 18 October 2021, Redknapp married model Frida Andersson, at Chelsea Register Office in London. The couple welcomed their first child on 24 November 2021, a boy named Raphael.

Career statistics

Club

International

Scores and results list England's goal tally first, score column indicates score after each Redknapp goal.

Honours

Player
Liverpool
Football League Cup: 1994–95
FA Charity Shield: 2001
UEFA Super Cup: 2001

England U21
 Toulon Tournament: 1993, 1994

References

External links

 Jamie Redknapp – Former Player on The North Stand
 Jamie Redknapp Player Profile
 
 Official past players at Liverpoolfc.tv
 Player profile at LFChistory.net 
 Jamie Redknapp index at Sporting-heroes.net

1973 births
Living people
People from New Milton
English footballers
Association football midfielders
England international footballers
England B international footballers
England under-21 international footballers
UEFA Euro 1996 players
Premier League players
English Football League players
AFC Bournemouth players
Liverpool F.C. players
Southampton F.C. players
Tottenham Hotspur F.C. players
People from New Forest District
People from Oxshott
Jamie
Association football coaches
FA Cup Final players
Daily Mail journalists